Marco de Santi (born 1983) is a Brazilian professional vert skater. Santi was the first person to ever land a triple backflip in the world at woodward's resi ramp. When inline skating was removed from the X-Games, vert skaters found other ways to profit from their sport and their talent. Santi joined Cirque du Soleil. Santi has won many X Games medals.

Vert Competitions
2008 LG Action Sports World Championships, Seattle - Vert: Gold Medalist
2005 LG Action Sports World Championship, Manchester - Vert 5th
2005 LG Action Sports World Tour, Moscow - Vert: 2nd
2004 LG Action Sports Championships: Silver Medalist
2004 X Games: 2nd
2004 Core Tour, New York: 1st
2003 NBC Gravity Games - Cleveland: 2nd
2003 ASA Pro Tour - Dulles: 6th
2002 ASA Pro Tour - Baltimore: 13th
2002 ESPN X Games: 12th
2001 ASA Pro Tour - Baltimore: 8th

References

External links

actionsportstour.com
skatelog.com
skatelog.com
espn.go.com
espn.go.com
kiaxgamesasia.com
rollernews.com
lgactionsports.com

1983 births
Living people
Vert skaters
X Games athletes